is a Japanese manga series written and illustrated by Keigo Shinzō. It was serialized in Kodansha's seinen manga magazine Monthly Morning Two from April 2018 to August 2020, with its chapters collected in four tankōbon volumes.

Publication
Nora to Zassō is written and illustrated by Keigo Shinzō. The series began in Kodansha's Monthly Morning Two on April 21, 2018. Shinzō was hospitalized and underwent treatment for lymphoma in April 2020, putting the manga on a short hiatus (Shinzō announced that his lymphoma is in full remission in November of the same year). The manga finished on August 21, 2020. Kodansha collected its chapters in four tankōbon volumes, released from November 22, 2018, to October 23, 2020.

The manga is licensed in France by Le Lézard Noir.

Volume list

Reception
Nora to Zassō was nominated for the French 14th ACBD's Prix Asie de la Critique 2020. The manga has been nominated for the Best Comic Award at the 48th Angoulême International Comics Festival 2021.

See also
Tokyo Alien Bros., another manga series by the same author
Hirayasumi, another manga series by the same author

References

External links
 

Kodansha manga
Seinen manga